The State Treasurer of Missouri is a statewide elected official responsible for serving as Missouri's chief financial officer. Vivek Malek has served as State Treasurer since January, 2023. 

Prior to Malek's appointment, the most recent state treasurer Scott Fitzpatrick resigned following his election as State Auditor of Missouri. Fitzpatrick was appointed in January 2019 following the resignation of the previous incumbent Eric Schmitt in order to accept appointment as Attorney General of Missouri. State Treasurers are limited to two terms in office, and  along with the Governor, is the only other statewide elected office in Missouri that is subject to term limits. Schmitt was elected as State Treasurer after Clint Zweifel was ineligible to seek reelection in the 2016 election, having been elected to two terms in the 2008 and 2012 elections, and announced that he would not run for any other political office that year. The most recent scheduled election for State Treasurer occurred in 2020 in which Scott Fitzpatrick was elected to a full term. Following Fitzpatrick's 2022 election as State Auditor of Missouri, his successor as State Treasurer, Vivek Malek was appointed by Governor Mike Parson, and assumed office on January 17, 2023.

Duties of the state treasurer
The state treasurer is responsible for managing more than $24 billion in annual revenues and more than $3.6 billion in state investments. Additionally, the state treasurer works to return nearly $700 million in unclaimed property to more than 4.3 million account owners. The state treasurer also helps oversee MOST - Missouri's 529 College Savings Plan, which helps families start building a college fund. 

As banking director for the state government, the state treasurer is responsible for authorizing disbursement of state funds, balancing the state accounts, contracting with private banks to process state receipts and disbursements, manage money and security transfers, and reporting on the state's financial activities. The state treasurer partners with Missouri banks to make low-interest loans to small businesses and farms through Missouri FIRST.

The state treasurer represents taxpayers by serving on the governing boards of the Missouri Housing Development Commission, the Missouri State Employees' Retirement System, the state Board of Fund Commissioners, and the Missouri Cultural Trust Board.

List of state treasurers

References

External links

Publications by or about the Office of the State Treasurer of Missouri at Internet Archive.

1820 establishments in Missouri Territory